Linear density is the measure of a quantity of any characteristic value per unit of length.  Linear mass density (titer in textile engineering, the amount of mass per unit length) and linear charge density (the amount of electric charge per unit length) are two common examples used in science and engineering.

The term linear density is most often used when describing the characteristics of one-dimensional objects, although linear density can also be used to describe the density of a three-dimensional quantity along one particular dimension.  Just as density is most often used to mean mass density, the term linear density likewise often refers to linear mass density.  However, this is only one example of a linear density, as any quantity can be measured in terms of its value along one dimension.

Linear mass density
Consider a long, thin rod of mass  and length .  To calculate the average linear mass density, of this one dimensional object, we can simply divide the total mass, by the total length, :

If we describe the rod as having a varying mass (one that varies as a function of position along the length of the rod), we can write:

Each infinitesimal unit of mass, is equal to the product of its linear mass density, and the infinitesimal unit of length, :

The linear mass density can then be understood as the derivative of the mass function with respect to the one dimension of the rod (the position along its length)

The SI unit of linear mass density is the kilogram per meter (kg/m).

Linear density of fibers and yarns can be measured by many methods. The simplest one is to measure a length of material and weigh it. However, this requires a large sample and masks the variability of linear density along the thread, and is difficult to apply if the fibers are crimped or otherwise cannot lay flat relaxed. If the density of the material is known, the fibers are measured individually and have a simple shape, a more accurate method is direct imaging of the fiber with a scanning electron microscope to measure the diameter and calculation of the linear density. Finally, linear density is directly measured with a vibroscope. The sample is tensioned between two hard points, mechanical vibration is induced and the fundamental frequency is measured.

Linear charge density
Consider a long, thin wire of charge  and length .  To calculate the average linear charge density, of this one dimensional object, we can simply divide the total charge, by the total length, :

If we describe the wire as having a varying charge (one that varies as a function of position along the length of the wire), we can write:

Each infinitesimal unit of charge, is equal to the product of its linear charge density, and the infinitesimal unit of length, :

The linear charge density can then be understood as the derivative of the charge function with respect to the one dimension of the wire (the position along its length)

Notice that these steps were exactly the same ones we took before to find .

The SI unit of linear charge density is the coulomb per meter (C/m).

Other applications

In drawing or printing, the term linear density also refers to how densely or heavily a line is drawn.

The most famous abstraction of linear density is the probability density function of a single random variable.

Units

Common units include:
kilogram per meter
ounce (mass) per foot
ounce (mass) per inch
pound (mass) per yard: used in the North American railway industry for the linear density of rails
pound (mass) per foot
pound (mass) per inch
tex, a unit of measure for the linear density of fibers, defined as the mass in grams per 1,000 meters
denier, a unit of measure for the linear density of fibers, defined as the mass in grams per 9,000 meters
decitex (dtex), the SI unit for the linear density of fibers, defined as the mass in grams per 10,000 meters

See also 
 Density
 Columnar density
 Paper density

References

Density